The individual eventing in equestrian at the 1948 Olympic Games in London was held in the town of Aldershot and at the Tweseldown Racecourse from 10 to 13 August. Bernard Chevallier of France won the gold medal. Frank Henry, from the United States, won silver and Robert Selfelt, from Sweden, took bronze. The team and individual eventing competitions used the same scores. Eventing consisted of a dressage test, a cross-country test, and a jumping test.

Results

Standings after dressage

Standings after cross-country

Final results after jumping

References

Sources
Organising Committee for the XIV Olympiad, The (1948). The Official Report of the Organising Committee for the XIV Olympiad, p. 342. LA84 Foundation. Retrieved 4 September 2016.

Equestrian at the Summer Olympics